Luke Philip Bolton (born 7 October 1999) is an English professional footballer who plays as a winger and full-back for  club Salford City.

Bolton began his career with Manchester City, and spent time on loan at Wycombe Wanderers, where he made his professional debut, Luton Town, and Scottish club Dundee United. He moved to Salford City in January 2022.

Club career
Born in Stockport, Bolton played in the 2018–19 EFL Trophy for Manchester City U21 against Barnsley and Rochdale, and was named in Manchester City's Champions League squad. He was an unused substitute for City's EFL Cup semi-final second leg against Burton Albion on 23 January 2019, and the following day joined League One club Wycombe Wanderers on loan until the end of the season. He made his Football League debut on 26 January as a second-half substitute in a 1–0 home win against Plymouth Argyle.

Bolton joined Luton Town on loan for the 2019–20 season. He was then loaned to Scottish Premiership club Dundee United for the 2020–21 season. Bolton's first senior goal came during his spell in Scotland, scoring a last-minute equaliser in a 1–1 draw with Hibernian on 19 December.

Bolton signed permanently for EFL League Two team Salford City in January 2022, signing a contract until June 2024. He explained his reason to sign for Salford was to play men's football consistently. He made his debut for the club on 8 February as an 80th minute substitute in a league match against Sutton United.

International career
He has represented England at under-20 level, and was a member of the squad that won the 2017 Toulon Tournament.

Playing style
During his time with Luton he played primarily as a full back rather than his usual position as a winger.

Career statistics

Honours
England U20
Toulon Tournament: 2017

References

External links

1999 births
Living people
Footballers from Stockport
English footballers
Association football fullbacks
Association football wingers
England youth international footballers
Manchester City F.C. players
Wycombe Wanderers F.C. players
Luton Town F.C. players
English Football League players
Dundee United F.C. players
Salford City F.C. players
Scottish Professional Football League players